Schilleroper was a theatre in Hamburg, Germany.

Theatres in Hamburg
Buildings and structures in Hamburg-Mitte